Charlotte Constance Wahlström (17 November 1849 – 22 February 1924) was a Swedish painter.

Biography
Wahlström was born  in the parish of Svärta in Södermanland, Sweden. She was the daughter of Anders Wahlström and Carolina Setterberg. She attended the Royal Swedish Academy of Fine Arts in Stockholm.

She traveled on a scholarship to Paris, Brittany in 1885 and later to Germany, the Netherlands and Belgium. In 1889, she spent a period in the artist colony in Barbizon.
Wahlström  exhibited  her work at the Palace of Fine Arts at the 1893 World's Columbian Exposition in Chicago, Illinois. She was awarded a bronze medal at the Louisiana Purchase Exposition at St. Louis, Missouri in 1904. Wahlström died in 1924 in Stockholm and was buried at Norra begravningsplatsen.

Her art is characterized by prominent landscapes often with motifs from Skåne.

Wahlström is represented at the Gothenburg Art Museum and the Nationalmuseum in Stockholm as well as at museums in  Östergötland, Malmö, Östersund and Örebro.

Gallery

References

External links
 
 images of Wahlström art on The Athenaeum
 

1849 births  
1924 deaths
People from Södermanland
Swedish women painters
19th-century Swedish women artists
20th-century Swedish women artists
19th-century Swedish painters
20th-century Swedish painters
Burials at Norra begravningsplatsen